In mathematics, at the intersection of algebraic topology and algebraic geometry, there is the notion of a Hopf algebroid which encodes the information of a presheaf of groupoids whose object sheaf and arrow sheaf are represented by algebras. Because any such presheaf will have an associated site, we can consider quasi-coherent sheaves on the site, giving a topos-theoretic notion of modules. Duallypg 2, comodules over a Hopf algebroid are the purely algebraic analogue of this construction, giving a purely algebraic description of quasi-coherent sheaves on a stack: this is one of the first motivations behind the theory.

Definition 
Given a commutative Hopf-algebroid  a left comodule pg 302 is a left -module  together with an -linear mapwhich satisfies the following two properties

 (counitary) 
 (coassociative) 

A right comodule is defined similarly, but instead there is a mapsatisfying analogous axioms.

Structure theorems

Flatness of Γ gives an abelian category 
One of the main structure theorems for comodulespg 303 is if  is a flat -module, then the category of comodules  of the Hopf-algebroid is an Abelian category.

Relation to stacks 
There is a structure theorempg 7 relating comodules of Hopf-algebroids and modules of presheaves of groupoids. If  is a Hopf-algebroid, there is an equivalence between the category of comodules  and the category of quasi-coherent sheaves  for the associated presheaf of groupoidsto this Hopf-algebroid.

Examples

From BP-homology 
Associated to the Brown-Peterson spectrum is the Hopf-algebroid  classifying p-typical formal group laws.

See also 

 Adams spectral sequence
Steenrod algebra

References 

Hopf algebras
Homotopical algebra
Algebraic topology
Algebraic geometry